Marvin Frederick Hamlisch (June 2, 1944 – August 6, 2012) was an American composer and conductor. Hamlisch was one of only 18 people to win Emmy, Grammy, Oscar and Tony awards, a feat dubbed the "EGOT". He and composer Richard Rodgers are the only people to have won those prizes and a Pulitzer Prize ("PEGOT").

Early life
Hamlisch was born in Manhattan, to Viennese-born Jewish parents Lilly (née Schachter) and Max Hamlisch. His father was an accordionist and bandleader. Hamlisch was a child prodigy; by age five, he began mimicking the piano music he heard on the radio. A few months before he turned seven, in 1951, he was accepted into what is now the Juilliard School Pre-College Division. His favorite musicals growing up were My Fair Lady, Gypsy, West Side Story, and Bye Bye Birdie.

Career 
Hamlisch attended Queens College, earning his Bachelor of Arts degree in 1967. His first job was as a rehearsal pianist for Funny Girl with Barbra Streisand. Shortly afterward, producer Sam Spiegel hired him to play piano at parties, and later to score Spiegel's 1968 film The Swimmer.

Music for films
Liza Minnelli's 1964 debut album included "The Travelin' Life", a song Hamlisch wrote in his teens (originally titled "Travelin' Man"). His first hit arrived when he was 21 years old: "Sunshine, Lollipops and Rainbows", co-written with Howard Liebling and recorded by Lesley Gore. It reached No. 13 on the Billboard Hot 100 in the summer of 1965. 

His first film score was for 1968's The Swimmer. He also wrote music for several early Woody Allen films, including Take the Money and Run (1969) and Bananas (1971). 

Hamlisch and Liebling co-wrote the song "California Nights", which was recorded by Lesley Gore for her 1967 hit album of the same name. The Bob Crewe-produced single peaked at No. 16 on the Hot 100 in March 1967, two months after Gore had performed the song on the Batman television series, in which she guest-starred as an accomplice to Julie Newmar's Catwoman.

Among Hamlisch's better-known works during the 1970s were adaptations of Scott Joplin's ragtime music for the motion picture The Sting, including its theme song, "The Entertainer". It hit No. 1 on Billboards Adult Contemporary chart and No. 3 on the Hot 100, selling nearly 2 million copies in the U.S. alone. He had great success in 1973, winning two Academy Awards for the title song and the score for the motion picture The Way We Were and an Academy Award for the adaptation score for The Sting. He won four Grammy Awards in 1974, two for "The Way We Were". 

In 1975, he wrote what, for its first 12 years, would be the original theme music for Good Morning America. He co-wrote "Nobody Does It Better" for The Spy Who Loved Me (1977) with his then-girlfriend Carole Bayer Sager, which would be nominated for an Oscar. In the 1980s, he had success with the scores for Ordinary People (1980) and Sophie's Choice (1982). He also received an Academy Award nomination in 1986 for the film version of A Chorus Line. 

In 1985 he worked on D.A.R.Y.L., a project film about a boy who is in fact a robot designed by the US military. He also worked on the score for The Informant! (2009), starring Matt Damon and directed by Steven Soderbergh. Prior to his death, he completed his first children's book Marvin Makes Music, which included the original music "The Music in My Mind" with words by Rupert Holmes, and the score for the HBO film Behind the Candelabra (2013), also directed by Soderbergh and starring Matt Damon and Michael Douglas as Liberace.

Stage
Hamlisch's first major stage work was in 1972 playing piano for Groucho Marx at Carnegie Hall for An Evening with Groucho. Hamlisch acted as both straight man and accompanist while Marx, at age 81, reminisced about his career in show business. The performances were released as a two-record set, and remained very popular.

He then composed the scores for the 1975 Broadway musical A Chorus Line, for which he won both a Tony Award and a Pulitzer Prize; and for the 1978 musical They're Playing Our Song, loosely based on his relationship with Carole Bayer Sager.

At the beginning of the 1980s, his romantic relationship with Bayer Sager ended, but their songwriting relationship continued. The 1983 musical Jean Seberg, based on the life of the real-life actress, failed in its London production at the UK's National Theatre and never played in the U.S. In 1986, Smile was a mixed success and had a short run on Broadway. The musical version of Neil Simon's The Goodbye Girl (1993) closed after only 188 performances, although he received a Drama Desk nomination, for Outstanding Music.

Shortly before his death, Hamlisch finished scoring a musical theatre version of The Nutty Professor, based on the 1963 film. The show played in July and August 2012, at the Tennessee Performing Arts Center (TPAC) in Nashville, aiming for a Broadway run. The book is by Rupert Holmes, and the production was directed by Jerry Lewis.

Conductor

Hamlisch was musical director and arranger of Barbra Streisand's 1994 concert tour of the U.S. and England as well as of the television special, Barbra Streisand: The Concert, for which he received two of his Emmys. He also conducted several tours of Linda Ronstadt during this period, most notably on her successful 1996 Dedicated to the One I Love tour of arenas and stadiums.

Hamlisch held the position of Principal Pops Conductor for the Pittsburgh Symphony Orchestra, the Milwaukee Symphony Orchestra, the San Diego Symphony, the Seattle Symphony, the Dallas Symphony Orchestra, Buffalo Philharmonic Orchestra, The National Symphony Orchestra Pops, The Pasadena Symphony and Pops, and the Baltimore Symphony Orchestra.

On July 23, 2011, Hamlisch conducted his debut concert for Pasadena Symphony and Pops at The Rose Bowl in Pasadena, California. Hamlisch replaced Rachael Worby.  At the time of his death, he was preparing to assume responsibilities as Principal Pops Conductor for The Philly POPS.

Honors and awards
Hamlisch is one of only 17 people to win Emmy, Grammy, Oscar and Tony awards. This collection of all four is referred to as an "EGOT". He is one of only two people to have won those four prizes and a Pulitzer Prize (Richard Rodgers is the other). He is one of ten people to win three or more Oscars in one night and the only one other than a director or screenwriter to do so. Hamlisch also won two Golden Globes. He earned ten Golden Globe Award nominations, winning twice for Best Original Song, with "Life Is What You Make It" in 1972 and "The Way We Were" in 1974.

He shared the Pulitzer Prize for Drama in 1976 with Michael Bennett, James Kirkwood, Nicholas Dante, and Edward Kleban for his musical contribution to the original Broadway production of A Chorus Line. Hamlisch received a Lifetime Achievement Award in 2009 at the World Soundtrack Awards in Ghent, Belgium. He was also inducted into the Long Island Music Hall of Fame in 2008. In 2008, he appeared as a judge in the Canadian reality series Triple Sensation which aired on CBC. The show was aimed to provide a training bursary to a talented young man or woman with the potential to be a leader in song, dance, and acting. In 2008, Hamlisch was also inducted into the American Theater Hall of Fame.

Academy Awards
In 1974, Hamlisch became the second person to win three Academy Awards in the same evening, following Billy Wilder in 1961.

Grammy Awards

Primetime Emmy Awards

Tony Awards

Personal life

Hamlisch's relationship with lyricist Carole Bayer Sager inspired the musical They're Playing Our Song.  He was also in a relationship with actress Emma Samms.  He was in a relationship with television personality Cyndy Garvey after her breakup with her husband, Steve Garvey.

In May 1989, Hamlisch married Terre Blair, a native of Columbus, Ohio and graduate of Otterbein College, who was the weather and news anchor for that city's ABC affiliate, WSYX-Channel 6. The marriage lasted until his death.

Death
After a brief illness, Hamlisch died after collapsing in Los Angeles on August 6, 2012, at the age of 68. According to a copy of Hamlisch's death certificate, the cause of death was determined to be respiratory arrest, with hypertension and cerebral hypoxia as contributing factors.

The Associated Press described him as having written "some of the best-loved and most enduring songs and scores in movie history". Barbra Streisand released a statement praising Hamlisch, stating it was "his brilliantly quick mind, his generosity and delicious sense of humor that made him a delight to be around". Aretha Franklin called him "classic and one of a kind", and one of the "all-time great" arrangers and producers. The head of the Pasadena Symphony and Pops commented that Hamlisch had "left a very specific ... original mark on American music and added to the great American songbook with works he himself composed".

At 8:00 p.m. EDT on August 8, the marquee lights of the 40 Broadway theaters were dimmed for one minute in tribute to Hamlisch, an honor traditionally accorded to those considered to have made significant contributions to the theater arts upon their death.

Barbra Streisand, Aretha Franklin, and Liza Minnelli took turns singing songs by Hamlisch during a memorial service for the composer on September 18, 2012. At the 2013 Academy Awards, Streisand sang "The Way We Were" in Hamlisch's memory. On June 2, 2013, a tribute was held in New York City to remember Hamlisch on the first anniversary of his death. At the tribute, Staples Players, a high school theatre group from Staples High School in Westport, Connecticut performed a selection of material from A Chorus Line. Other veterans of the screen and stage also performed at the event.

Work

Orchestral work

Hamlisch was the primary conductor for the Pittsburgh Pops from 1995 until his death.

The Dallas Symphony Orchestra performed a rare Hamlisch classical symphonic suite titled Anatomy of Peace (Symphonic Suite in one Movement For Full Orchestra/Chorus/Child Vocal Soloist) on November 19, 1991. It was also performed at Carnegie Hall in 1993,  and in Paris in 1994 to commemorate D-Day. The work was recorded by the Dallas Symphony Orchestra in 1992. The Anatomy of Peace was a book by Emery Reves which expressed the world-federalist sentiments shared by Albert Einstein and many others in the late 1940s, in the period immediately following World War II.

Theatre

Film

See also
List of people who have won Academy, Emmy, Grammy, and Tony Awards

References

Further reading

External links

Marvin Hamlisch: What He Did For Love — full video of biography film on PBS.org

PBS article
Marvin Hamlisch and the Pittsburgh Pops
www.marvinhamlisch.us — Official site
Marvin Hamlisch interview on BBC Radio 4 Desert Island Discs, December 9, 1983

1944 births
2012 deaths
20th-century American Jews
21st-century American Jews
American film score composers
American musical theatre composers
American people of Austrian-Jewish descent
American television composers
ASCAP composers and authors
Best Original Music Score Academy Award winners
Best Original Song Academy Award-winning songwriters
Broadway composers and lyricists
Burials at Mount Zion Cemetery (New York City)
Composers from New York City
Deaths from hypertension
Deaths from hypoxia
Drama Desk Award winners
Emmy Award winners
Golden Globe Award-winning musicians
Grammy Award winners
Jewish American film score composers
Jewish American songwriters
Jewish American television composers
Juilliard School Pre-College Division alumni
Male musical theatre composers
Musicians from New York City
Neurological disease deaths in California
People from Manhattan
Pulitzer Prize for Drama winners
Queens College, City University of New York alumni
Songwriters from New York (state)
Tony Award winners